Słodków Drugi  is a village in the administrative district of Gmina Kraśnik, within Kraśnik County, Lublin Voivodeship, in eastern Poland.

In 2006 the village had a population of 676.

References

Villages in Kraśnik County